The men's 5000 metres in speed skating at the 1998 Winter Olympics took place on 8 February, at the M-Wave arena.

Records
Prior to this competition, the existing world and Olympic records were as follows:

The following new world and olympic records was set during this competition.

Results

References

Men's speed skating at the 1998 Winter Olympics